Bantrothu Bharya (translation:Wife of Peon) is a 1974 Telugu drama film directed by Dasari Narayana Rao and produced by Allu Aravind and Dasari Narayana Murthy under Geetha Arts. The film stars Chalam, Krishnam Raju, Srividya and Vijaya Nirmala in the lead roles. The music was composed by Ramesh Naidu. It is the first film produced by Geetha Arts. The film was remade of Malayalam movie Bhoomidevi Pushpiniyayi (1974).

Cast
 Chalam
 Krishnam Raju
 Vijaya Nirmala
 Sri Vidya
 Rao Gopal Rao
 Allu Rama Lingaiah
 Suryakantham
 Kommineni Seshagiri Rao
 Edida Nageswara Rao
 Kakarala
 Bala Krishna
 Mada Venkateswara Rao
 Sakshi Ranga Rao

External links

1974 films
Indian drama films
Films directed by Dasari Narayana Rao
Films scored by Ramesh Naidu
Geetha Arts films
1970s Telugu-language films
1974 drama films